Money is a medium of exchange by which humans pay for things, or a unit of account or store of value.

Money may also refer to:

Places
 Money Creek, Minnesota, an unincorporated community, United States
 Money, Mississippi, an unincorporated community, United States
 Money, Virginia, an unincorporated community, United States
 Money, Foyran, a townland in Foyran civil parish, barony of Fore, County Westmeath, Republic of Ireland
 Money, a townland in County Armagh, Northern Ireland

People
 Money (surname), a list of people with the name
 Money (nickname), a list of people known by the nickname
 Eddie Money (1949–2019), American musician
 JT Money, American musician
 J-Money, American musician, member of Cadillac Don & J-Money

Books
 Money (play), an 1840 play by Edward Bulwer-Lytton
 Money (novel), a 1984 novel by Martin Amis
 Money (magazine), a Time Inc. personal finance magazine
 Money (Australian magazine), an ACP Magazines business and finance magazine

Film and television
 Money (1921 film), a comedy directed by Duncan McRae
 Money (1991 film), a 1991 drama directed by Steven Hilliard Stern
 Money (1993 film), a 1993 Telugu film directed by Shiva Nageswara Rao
 Money (2016 film), a 2016 American film
 Money (2019 film), a 2019 South Korean film
 Money (Australian TV program), a 1993–2002 Australian financial and investment television program hosted by Paul Clitheroe that was broadcast on Nine Network
 Money (UK TV series), a 2010 two-part British television series based on the Martin Amis novel that aired on BBC
 "Money" (Blackadder), a television episode
 "Money" (The Office), a television episode
 "The Money", an episode of Seinfeld
 The Money, a 2014 television pilot featuring Ray Liotta

Music
 Money (band), an English rock band

Albums
 Money (album), by KMFDM, 1992
 Money (EP), by Ringside, 2010

Songs
 “Money” (Pink Floyd song)
 "Money" (Cardi B song)
 "Money" (David Guetta song)
 "Money" (Elin Lanto song)
 "Money" (Jamelia song)
 "Money" (KMFDM song)
 "Money" (K. T. Oslin song)
 "Money" (Lawson song)
 "Money" (Lime Cordiale song)
 "Money" (Lisa song)
 "Money" (Michael Jackson song)
 "Money (That's What I Want)", by Barrett Strong, also covered by The Beatles and by The Flying Lizards
 "Money", by 5 Seconds of Summer, from the album Sounds Good Feels Good
 "Money", by Badfinger, from the album Straight Up
 "Money", by Bros, from the album The Time
 "Money", by Charli Baltimore, from the album Cold as Ice
 "Money", by Drake, from the mixtape Room for Improvement
 "Money", by The Game, from the album LAX
 "Money", by Gamma Ray, from the album Heading for Tomorrow
 "Money", by Girls Aloud, from the album The Sound of Girls Aloud: The Greatest Hits
 "Money", by Gladys Knight & The Pips, from the album 2nd Anniversary
 "Money", by I Fight Dragons, from the EP Cool Is Just a Number
 "Money", by John Butler Trio, from the album Three
 "Money", by John Kander and Fred Ebb, from the musical Cabaret
 "Money", by Laura Nyro, from the album Smile
 "Money", by The Lovin' Spoonful, from the album Everything Playing
 "Money", by Mindless Self Indulgence, from the album If
 "Money", by Peace, from the album Happy People
 "Money", by Serj Tankian from the album Elect the Dead
 "Money", by Space, from the album Spiders
 "Money", by Suede, from the album Sci-Fi Lullabies
 "Money", by Vitamin C, from the album Vitamin C
 "Money", by Yes, from the album Tormato
 "Money", (also known as "Got Some Money"), by Bill Wurtz
 "Money Song", from the British television series Monty Python's Flying Circus
 "Gotta Get My Hands on Some (Money)", by Fatback Band

Computing and Internet
 Money (software), personal finance software for Mac OS X by Jumsoft
 Money.co.uk, a UK-based price comparison website 
 Microsoft Money, a financial software package

See also
 "For the Love of Money", a 1973 song by the O'Jays
 Love of money
 "Money, Money, Money", a 1976 song by ABBA
 "Money Changes Everything", a 1978 song by The Brains
 "Money for Nothing", a 1985 song by Dire Straits
 The Money Programme, a former BBC finance and business affairs television programme
 L'Argent (disambiguation) (French for "money")